William Patrick O'Connor (October 18, 1886 – July 13, 1973) was an American prelate of the Catholic Church. He served as the fifth bishop of the Diocese of Superior in Wisconsin (1942–1946) and the first bishop of the new Diocese of Madison in Wisconsin (1946–1967).

Biography

Early life
William O'Connor was born on October 18, 1886 in Milwaukee, Wisconsin, one of five children of Patrick and Ellen (née McCarthy) O'Connor. He received his early education at St. John Cathedral grade school in Milwaukee, and then entered St. Francis Seminary in St. Francis, Wisconsin in 1901.

Priesthood 
O'Connor was ordained to the priesthood on March 10, 1912, by Bishop Joseph Koudelka.His first assignment was as assistant pastor of St. Rose of Lima Church in Milwaukee, where he remained for four years. During this time, he also studied at Marquette University and earned a Bachelor of Philosophy degree in 1916. O'Connor then entered the Catholic University of America in Washington, D.C., but his studies were interrupted by World War I.

In 1917, O'Connor was commissioned as a first lieutenant in the Wisconsin National Guard and served as a chaplain with the 32nd Infantry Division in France He was awarded the French Croix de Guerre medal for bravery in action.

After the war, O'Connor resumed his studies at Catholic University and earned his Doctor of Philosophy degree in 1921. He returned to Milwaukee, where he taught philosophy at St. Francis Seminary for 20 years. He was named president of the American Catholic Philosophical Association in 1939, and became pastor of St. Thomas Aquinas Parish in Milwaukee in 1941.

Bishop of Superior
On December 27, 1941, O'Connor was appointed the fifth bishop of the Diocese of Superior by Pope Pius XII. He received his episcopal consecration on March 7, 1942, from Archbishop Moses E. Kiley, with Bishops Aloisius Muench and Vincent Ryan serving as co-consecrators.

During his tenure as bishop, O'Connor founded three new parishes, opened two new schools, and erected ten units of the Confraternity of Christian Doctrine with a total enrollment of 12,000 children. A former military chaplain, he also oversaw the diocese's war efforts during World War II, including local blood drives.

Bishop of Madison
O'Connor was appointed by Pius XII as the first bishop of the newly-created Diocese of Madison on February 22, 1946. O'Connor was installed at Saint Raphael's Cathedral on the following March 12.

During his tenure, the diocese went from having 135 priests serving 82,000 Catholics to having 290 priests serving a Catholic population of 180,640. In his first year as bishop, O'Connor established the Blessed Martin Guild to promote racial understanding and convert more minorities to Catholicism. He also founded Holy Name Seminary in Madison in 1965, and participated in the Second Vatican Council (1962–1965). As part of the Council's reforms, he established a diocesan Priest Senate in 1966.

Retirement and legacy 
On February 18, 1967, Pope Paul VI accepted O'Connor's resignation as bishop of the Diocese of Madison after 21 years of service. William O'Connor died of a heart attack in Madison on July 13, 1973, at age 86.

See also

 Catholic Church hierarchy
 Catholic Church in the United States
 Historical list of the Catholic bishops of the United States
 List of Catholic bishops of the United States
 Lists of patriarchs, archbishops, and bishops

References

External links
 Roman Catholic Archdiocese of Milwaukee
 Roman Catholic Diocese of Madison 
 Roman Catholic Diocese of Superior

1886 births
1973 deaths
Marquette University alumni
St. Francis Seminary (Wisconsin) alumni
American Roman Catholic clergy of Irish descent
Catholic University of America alumni
World War I chaplains
United States Army chaplains
Roman Catholic Archdiocese of Milwaukee
Religious leaders from Milwaukee
Participants in the Second Vatican Council
Roman Catholic bishops of Superior
Roman Catholic bishops of Madison
20th-century Roman Catholic bishops in the United States